Macomber Stone House is a historic home located in Duanesburg in Schenectady County, New York. It was built about 1836 and is a two-story, five bay, center hall vernacular Federal style dwelling with a gable roof and narrow cornice.  It is constructed of field dressed random ashlar, local limestone.  Also on the property are three contributing 19th century frame barns with clapboard siding.

The property was covered in a 1984 study of Duanesburg historical resources.
It was listed on the National Register of Historic Places in 1984.

References

Houses on the National Register of Historic Places in New York (state)
Houses in Schenectady County, New York
Federal architecture in New York (state)
Houses completed in 1836
National Register of Historic Places in Schenectady County, New York